Christopher David Dicomidis (born 14 September 1985) is a rugby union player for Pontypridd RFC in the Principality Premiership, and for the Cyprus national team.

Born in Pencoed, Dicomidis progressed through the junior teams of Pencoed RFC, before joining the junior side of Cardiff RFC – Cardiff Junior Blue & Blacks before it disbanded at Under 15's level and moved to Old Penarthians RFC. He then joined Tondu RFC as a fullback.

Dicomidis and was capped by Wales at FIRA under 19 level, as a Lock, and also figured in the Celtic Warriors academy.

Studying sports and leisure management at UWIC, Dicomidis represented the university team in the first division during the 2004–05 season, making a number of appearances on permit for Pontypridd RFC in the league and cup. Further international honours followed with Wales Universities.

At the beginning of the 2005–06 season, Dicomidis was drafted into the Pontypridd senior squad. A good run of form was rewarded with a call up to the Wales under 21 squad, for whom he won caps during the Six Nations campaign and the age group World Cup tournament in France.

Dicomidis was voted joint recipient of the "Most Improved Player of the Year" award for 2006 by the Pontypridd Supporters' Club.

Dicomidis, who plays at Lock, Flanker or Number 8 was handed the captaincy of the Pontypridd team at the beginning of the 2010/11 season and captained the club to win the Welsh cup in 2010-2011 (the season Pontypridd also finished as runaway league winners but lost out in the play off final to Llanelli RFC), the league in 2011-2012 (also leading the team to the final of the Swalec cup competition) and to the club's first league and cup double in 2012–13. Dicomidis was also a member of the squad that successfully achieved the double-double by winning the cup and league double for a second season in a row in 2013–14.

On 27 November 2013 Cardiff Blues announced the signing of Dicomidis on a long-term deal. Dicomidis said "I'm excited about the opportunity to become part of the Blues squad and taking my chance at professional rugby".

Chris Dicomidis is a top level coach at ccyd who over the last 2 years has had a massive 3 wins to his senior squad of fantastic talent with the likes of cian thacker, connor berry, tom painter(vc), luke lockyer (c), scott hunter, tom boobyer, rhys cawley.

References

External links
Pontypridd RFC profile

1985 births
Living people
Pontypridd RFC players
Cypriot rugby union players
Cyprus international rugby union players
Welsh rugby union players
Tondu RFC players
Rugby union players from Pencoed
Welsh people of Greek Cypriot descent
Rugby union locks